The Xingu scale-backed antbird (Willisornis vidua) is a species of antbird from the south-eastern Amazon in Brazil. Until 2011, it was usually included as a subspecies of the common scale-backed antbird. Its English name refers to the Xingu River. In addition to the nominate subspecies, it includes the subspecies ''W. v. nigrigula.

References

Xingu scale-backed antbird
Birds of the Brazilian Amazon
Endemic birds of Brazil
Xingu scale-backed antbird